The River Evenlode is a tributary of the Thames in Oxfordshire. It rises near Moreton-in-Marsh, Gloucestershire, in the Cotswold Hills and flows south-east to the Thames, its valley providing the route of the southern part of the Cotswold Line.

The name Evenlode is modern; until the late 1890s the river was called the River Blade, hence the name of Bladon, even though strictly Bladon is on the River Glyme, a tributary; the Ordnance Survey map of 1884 already uses the name Evenlode.

The River Evenlode passes through Evenlode, Bledington, Shipton-under-Wychwood, Ascott-under-Wychwood and Charlbury. The river joins the Thames approximately one mile down river from Cassington on the reach above King's Lock, 3 miles (5 km) north-west of Oxford.

The river is largely privately owned, used for fishing and other leisure activities. The Environment Agency has undertaken restoration work, as of 2008, to recover from the effects of excessive dredging. Powered craft are not allowed on the river. Hilaire Belloc commemorated the river in some of his poetry.

See also
List of rivers in England
Tributaries of the River Thames

References

Evenlode, River
Evenlode, River
West Oxfordshire District
Cotswolds